Quyết Thắng is a ward located in Biên Hòa city of Đồng Nai province, Vietnam. It has an area of about 1.3km2 and the population as of 2017 was 19,214.

References

Bien Hoa